The 1888 Vermont gubernatorial election took place on September 4, 1888. Incumbent Republican Ebenezer J. Ormsbee, per the "Mountain Rule", did not run for re-election to a second term as Governor of Vermont. Republican candidate William P. Dillingham defeated Democratic candidate Stephen C. Shurtleff to succeed him.

Results

References

Vermont
1888
Gubernatorial
September 1888 events